Brijesh Kumar Gupta is a Nepalese politician, belonging to the People's Progressive Party. In the 2008 and 2013 Constituent Assembly election he was elected from the Kapilvastu-3 constituency, .

Early life
Gupta was born to Bhagwan Das Gupta and his wife, in a village named Thulo Bargadawa previously known as Sahu Bargadawa in Kapilvastu Municipality-5 of Kapilvastu, Nepal.

References

Living people
Nepal MPs 2017–2022
People's Progressive Party (Nepal) politicians
Rastriya Prajatantra Party politicians
Nepal MPs 1999–2002
People from Kapilvastu District
Members of the 1st Nepalese Constituent Assembly
Members of the 2nd Nepalese Constituent Assembly
Communist Party of Nepal (Unified Marxist–Leninist) politicians
Terai Madhesh Loktantrik Party politicians
1970 births